The Islamic State insurgency in the North Caucasus refers to the ongoing terror activity of the Islamic State branch in the North Caucasus after the insurgency of the Caucasus Emirate.

History
From 2015, during the Insurgency in the North Caucasus, after the series of killings of leaders of the Caucasus Emirate by the Russian army between 2013 and 2014, they led to the weakening of the terrorist organization, leaving several members of IS, veterans of the Syrian Civil War and the Civil War in Iraq, founded a Province of IS in the North Caucasus. On 23 June 2015, IS's spokesman Abu Mohammad al-Adnani accepted these pledges and announced the creation of a new Wilayah, or Province, covering the North Caucasus region. Adnani named Asildarov as the IS leader of this area and called on other militants in the region to follow him.
The first attack of the group occurred on a Russian military base in southern Dagestan on 2 September 2015. In a video also released in September, Asildarov called on IS supporters in the Caucasus to join the fight there, rather than travel to Iraq and Syria.
From 2015 to 2017, the group made other attacks on civilians and the security fources, causing more than 180 deaths. By the end of 2017, a lot of the subversive and terrorist groups operating in North Caucasus were eliminated and the Insurgency in the North Caucasus was officially declared over on 19 December of the same year, when FSB Director Alexander Bortnikov announced the final elimination of the insurgent underground in the North Caucasus.
After this, the Caucasus Emirate and the IS Caucasus Province was disbanded, leaving a lot of underground groups to continue the insurgency. From the end of the Insurgency in the North Caucasus, the most violent terrorist attack perpetrated by the Islamic State in Russia was the mass shooting into a church in Kizlyar on 18 February 2018 causing six deaths (including the perpetrator) and 4 injured.
On 21 April 2018, in a clash between Russian security forces and IS, nine IS militants were killed in Dagestan.
On 20 August 2018, IS launched attacks in Chechnya, injuring a number of policemen; five suspected IS members were killed.
On 24 January 2019, IS attacked a police post, leaving four IS members killed and one policeman injured in Kabardino-Balkaria. 
On July 1, ISIS claimed responsibility for an attack on a police officer at a checkpoint in the Achkhoy-Martonovsky district of Chechnya, who was stabbed to death. The attacker was shot and killed as he threw a grenade at other officers.
On 20 January 2021, Aslan Byutukayev, also known as Emir Khamzat and Abubakar, a Chechen insurgent commander of the Islamic State, was killed alongside five other IS militants in a special operation launched by the Ministry of Internal Affairs of Chechnya in Katyr-Yurt, Chechnya; four soldiers were injured.

List of clashes in the North Caucasus 
 List of clashes in the North Caucasus in 2018
 List of clashes in the North Caucasus in 2019

Casualties

See also
Insurgency in the North Caucasus
Syrian Civil War
War in Iraq

References

North Caucasus
Conflicts in 2017
Terrorism in Russia
Islam in the Caucasus